World Cry is a reggae album by Jah Cure. It was released on May 14, 2013. The album has guest appearances from artists such as Jazmine Sullivan and Mavado, crossing the Reggae, Hip-hop, Latin, Pop and R&B genres.

Reception
The album peaked at No. 7 on the Billboard Reggae Albums Chart.

Track listing 
 "Nothing Is Impossible"
 "Can't Wait"
 "Co-Sign"
 "Before I Leave"
 "Unconditional Love"
 "Only Vice"
 "Choose Up" (featuring Jazmine Sullivan)
 "Me Miss"
 "Like I See It" (featuring Mavado)
 "World Cry"
 "Reach Out"
 "Save Yourself"
 "Praises To Jah" (featuring Phyllisia)
 "All By Myself"

Charts

References

2013 albums
Jah Cure albums